Freddy Beras Goico is a Santo Domingo Metro station on Line 2. It was open on 1 April 2013 as part of the inaugural section of Line 2 between María Montez and Eduardo Brito. The station is located between Pedro Mir and Juan Ulises García Saleta.

This is an underground station built below Avenida John F. Kennedy. It is named in honor of Freddy Beras-Goico.

References

Santo Domingo Metro stations
2013 establishments in the Dominican Republic
Railway stations opened in 2013